Pine Beach station is a commuter rail station operated by Exo in Dorval, Quebec, Canada, located in the Pine Beach neighbourhood. It is served by the Vaudreuil–Hudson line.

 on weekdays, 10 of 11 inbound trains and 10 of 12 outbound trains on the line call at this station, with the others skipping it. On weekends, all trains (four on Saturday and three on Sunday in each direction) call here. 

The station is located north of Autoroute 20 at the corner of Avenue Cardinal and Boulevard Pine Beach. The station possesses shelters but no station building. The station has two side platforms; access between them is provided by a tunnel with headhouses on either side of the tracks, a third on the north side of the highway (adjacent to a bus stop), and a fourth on the south side of the highway. 

A station named Bel Air was open at this location in the 1890s, but closed thereafter. Pine Beach station entered service by 1953.

Bus connections

Société de transport de Montréal

References

External links
 Pine Beach Commuter Train Station Information (RTM)
 Pine Beach Commuter Train Station Schedule (RTM)
 2016 STM System Map

Exo commuter rail stations
Railway stations in Montreal
Buildings and structures in Dorval
Transport in Dorval